The 2019 German Athletics Championships was the 119th edition of the national championship in outdoor track and field for Germany. It was held on 3 and 4 August at the Olympiastadion in Berlin. It served as the selection meeting for Germany at the 2019 World Championships in Athletics.

Championships
As usual, due to time or organizational reasons, various competitions were not held as part of the main event in Berlin. These include championships for the 50 km road race, ultra trail and 24-hour race, which were previously organised by the German Ultramarathon Association (DUV) and now organised by the German Athletics Federation (DLV). For the first time, the 4 × 400 m relays were contested separately. The annual national championships in Germany comprised the following competitions:

Results

Men

Women

References

External links 
 Official website of the Deutscher Leichtathletik-Verband (DLV; German Athletics Association) 

2019
Sports competitions in Berlin
Athletics in Berlin
Athletics Championships
German Championships
Athletics Championships
German Championships